Nils Rune Lindström (born 26 May 1944) is a Swedish former alpine skier who competed in the 1964 and 1968 Winter Olympics.

External links
 sports-reference.com
 

1944 births
Swedish male alpine skiers
Alpine skiers at the 1964 Winter Olympics
Alpine skiers at the 1968 Winter Olympics
Olympic alpine skiers of Sweden
People from Sollefteå Municipality
Living people
Sportspeople from Västernorrland County
20th-century Swedish people